The Netherlands Entomological Society (abbreviated NEV) was founded in 1845 for the purpose of improving and promoting entomology in the Netherlands. The society has more than 600 members.

External links
Official website: Nederlandse Entomologische Vereniging 

Entomological societies
Scientific organisations based in the Netherlands
1845 establishments in the Netherlands
Scientific organizations established in 1845